The 1959–60 Spartan League season was the 42nd in the history of Spartan League. The league consisted of 15 teams.

League table

The division featured 15 teams, 13 from last season and 2 new teams:
 Molesey, from Surrey Senior League
 Bletchley Town, from Hellenic League

References

1959-60
9